Dopesick is an American drama miniseries, created by Danny Strong for Hulu. Based on the non-fiction book Dopesick: Dealers, Doctors, and the Drug Company that Addicted America by Beth Macy, it premiered on October 13, 2021, and concluded on November 17, 2021, after eight episodes.

The series received mostly positive reviews from critics, with particular praise for the performances of the cast, most notably those of Kaitlyn Dever and Michael Keaton. At the 74th Primetime Emmy Awards, the series received fourteen nominations, including Outstanding Limited or Anthology Series and acting nominations for Keaton, Dever, Will Poulter, Peter Sarsgaard, Michael Stuhlbarg, and Mare Winningham, with Keaton winning for Outstanding Lead Actor in a Limited or Anthology Series or Movie. In addition, Keaton also won as Lead Actor at the 79th Golden Globe Awards, 28th Screen Actors Guild Awards and 12th Critics' Choice Television Awards.

Premise
Dopesick focuses on "the epicenter of America's struggle with opioid addiction" across the U.S., on how individuals and families are affected by it, on the alleged conflicts of interest involving Purdue Pharma and various government agencies such as the Food and Drug Administration and the United States Department of Justice, and finally, on the legal case against Purdue Pharma and their development, testing and marketing of the drug OxyContin.

Cast and characters

Most of the characters in the series are fictional and composite characters; Mountcastle, Ramseyer, and the members of the Sackler family are the only main characters based directly on real people.

Main

Recurring

Episodes

Production

Development
On June 17, 2020, it was announced that Hulu had given the production a limited series order consisting of eight episodes based on the book, Dopesick: Dealers, Doctors and the Drug Company that Addicted America by Beth Macy. The series was created by Danny Strong who also serves as executive producer alongside Michael Keaton, Warren Littlefield, John Goldwyn, Beth Macy, Karen Rosenfelt, and Barry Levinson who directed the limited series. Production companies involved with the series are 20th Television (replacing the initially announced Fox 21 Television Studios), John Goldwyn Productions and The Littlefield Company.

Casting
Alongside the miniseries announcement, Michael Keaton was also cast in a starring role. In September 2020, Peter Sarsgaard, Kaitlyn Dever, Will Poulter, and John Hoogenakker joined the main cast, with Phillipa Soo and Jake McDorman joining in recurring roles. In October 2020, Rosario Dawson was cast as a series regular, while Ray McKinnon was cast in a recurring role. In November 2020, Cleopatra Coleman joined the cast in a recurring role. In December 2020, Michael Stuhlbarg was cast as a series regular. In January 2021, Jaime Ray Newman, Andrea Frankle and Will Chase joined the cast in recurring roles. In March 2021, Rebecca Wisocky and Meagen Fay were cast in recurring capacities. In April 2021, Trevor Long joined the cast of the series in a recurring capacity.

Filming
Principal photography began in December 2020 in Richmond, Virginia and Clifton Forge, Virginia and continued through May 2021. North Carolina and Georgia were in contention, but Virginia was selected for its tax incentives and locations.

Release
Dopesick was released on Hulu on October 13, 2021. The first episode screened at the Virginia Film Festival on October 30, 2021, followed by a discussion with Danny Strong and Beth Macy. Internationally, the series premiered on the Star content hub of Disney+, Disney+ Hotstar and Star+ on November 12, 2021, The first two episodes airing that day with subsequent episodes released on Wednesdays.

Reception

Critical response
The review aggregator website Rotten Tomatoes reported an 89% approval rating with an average rating of 7.7/10, based on 70 critic reviews. The website's critics consensus reads, "Dopesick at times sinks under the weight of its subject matter, but strong performances from Michael Keaton and Kaitlyn Dever and an empathetic approach to the very real people impacted by the opioid crisis make for harrowing drama." Metacritic, which uses a weighted average, assigned a score of 68 out of 100 based on 25 critics, indicating "generally favorable reviews".

Joel Keller of Decider called the series ambitious and sprawling, stating Danny Strong succeeds to provide different stories in a non-linear fashion, and praised the performances of the cast, writing, "The series is definitely buoyed by its strong performances, from Keaton’s reserved and reticent Dr. Fennix, to Dever's confident portrayal of Betsy, who just wants to be herself but knows it can’t be in her hometown. Sarsgaard and Dawson do their usual excellent work." Fionnuala Halligan of Screen Daily applauded the performances of the actors, calling the cast "stellar," and praised Strong's writing for not sugarcoating the exploration of the Sackler family and Purdue Pharma's role in America's opioid crisis, stating, "The result is a solid, increasingly effective and satisfyingly well-made drama." 

Ed Cumming of The Independent rated the miniseries 5 out of 5 stars, found Dopesick to be an ambitious drama series, saying, "It aims to explore the scandal from the Sacklers down, opening with the development of the drug in the 1980s, to show how greedy bosses and avaricious sales reps were able to hijack the good intentions of doctors all over the country," praised the performances of the cast members and called the script "admirably tight," while complimenting the direction. Kristen Baldwin of Entertainment Weekly gave the series an A-, praised the performances of the cast and their chemistry, writing, "Dopesick deftly corrals the vast addiction epidemic through intimate, deeply engrossing stories of human devastation." Reviewing the series for USA Today, Kelly Lawler gave a rating of 3 out of 4 stars and described the cast as "excellent and empathetic, helping ground the series. Keaton is at his best, mastering a character who's a mess of contradictions and transformation." Matt Cabral of Common Sense Media rated the series 4 out of 5 stars, praised the depiction of positive messages and role models, citing teamwork and benevolence, and complimented the diverse representations of the actors.

Accolades

References

External links 

2020s American drama television miniseries
2021 American television series debuts
2021 American television series endings
American television miniseries
Hulu original programming
Opioid epidemic
Opioids in the United States
Opioids in fiction
Primetime Emmy Award-winning television series
Television series by 20th Century Fox Television
Television shows based on non-fiction books
Television shows filmed in Virginia
Television series set in the 1980s
Television series set in the 1990s
Television series set in the 2000s